Ronald Thomas Tulloch (5 June 1933 – 15 July 1981) was a Scottish professional footballer who played as an inside forward. He began his career with Heart of Midlothian before playing in the Football League for Southend United and Carlisle United, retiring in 1960.

References

External links
Profile at ENFA

1933 births
1981 deaths
People from Haddington, East Lothian
Scottish footballers
Heart of Midlothian F.C. players
Southend United F.C. players
Carlisle United F.C. players
English Football League players
Association football inside forwards